The 5.6.7.8's Can't Help It! is a compilation album by The 5.6.7.8's which was released 1991 in Australia (Au Go Go Records) and the United States (Rockville Records).

Track listing
 "Ah-So"
 "Let's Have a Party"
 "Pinball Party"
 "Jet Coaster"
 "Wooly Bully"
 "Wild Thing"
 "Bond Girl"
 "Motor Cycle Go-Go!"
 "Fruit Bubble Love"
 "The 5.6.7.8's"
 "Woo Eee"
 "Edie Is a Sweet Candy"
 "I Was a Teenage Cave Woman"
 "Blue Radio"

References 

The 5.6.7.8's albums
1993 compilation albums
Au Go Go Records compilation albums
Garage punk compilation albums